Oranienbaum is a former town and a former municipality in the district of Wittenberg, in Saxony-Anhalt, Germany. Since 1 January 2011, it is a District of the town of Oranienbaum-Wörlitz. It is situated south of the Elbe, east of Dessau.

History

The former settlement of Nischwitz was renamed in 1673 after Countess Henriette Catherine of Nassau, a scion of the House of Orange-Nassau and princess consort of the then ruling Prince John George II of Anhalt-Dessau.

From 1683 on, the Countess had the Oranienbaum Palace erected according to plans by the Dutch architect Cornelis Ryckwaert. The parks are today included within the Dessau-Wörlitz Garden Realm, a UNESCO World Heritage Site since 2000.

Sights

 Oranienbaum Palace, park and Chinese garden with pagoda
 Baroque parish church, built in 1712
 Monument Path with 29 stations
 Historical market square
 Dutch architectural style of the 19th century

International relations

  Daun, Germany

See also
Oranienburg

References

External links
 Municipal site

Former municipalities in Saxony-Anhalt
Oranienbaum-Wörlitz
House of Orange-Nassau
Duchy of Anhalt